Waldemar Dutra (born 20 February 1983 in Canada) is a Canadian retired soccer player.

Career

For 2003/04, Dutra signed for NK Osijek in Croatia. However, the club's head coach and president fought over his playing time and his only appearance came when the coach went behind the president's back to put him in the lineup.

In 2004, Dutra signed for Schweinfurt 05 in the German fourth division because he thought carving out a professional career in Canada and the United States was difficult.

References

External links
 

Canadian soccer players
Living people
Association football midfielders
1983 births
Calgary Storm players
NK Osijek players
1. FC Schweinfurt 05 players
Soccer people from Alberta
Sportspeople from Sherwood Park